Ragged Ass Road may refer to: 
Ragged Ass Road (album), a Tom Cochrane album
Ragged Ass Road (Yellowknife), a street in Yellowknife, Northwest Territories, Canada